In mathematics, the n-th hyperharmonic number of order r, denoted by , is recursively defined by the relations:

 

and

 

In particular,  is the n-th harmonic number.

The hyperharmonic numbers were discussed by J. H. Conway and R. K. Guy in their 1995 book The Book of Numbers.

Identities involving hyperharmonic numbers

By definition, the hyperharmonic numbers satisfy the recurrence relation

In place of the recurrences, there is a more effective formula to calculate these numbers:

 

The hyperharmonic numbers have a strong relation to combinatorics of permutations. The generalization of the identity

 

reads as

 

where  is an r-Stirling number of the first kind.

Asymptotics

The above expression with binomial coefficients easily gives that for all fixed order r>=2 we have.
 
that is, the quotient of the left and right hand side tends to 1 as n tends to infinity.

An immediate consequence is that
 

when m>r.

Generating function and infinite series

The generating function of the hyperharmonic numbers is

 

The exponential generating function is much more harder to deduce. One has that for all r=1,2,...

 
where 2F2 is a hypergeometric function. The r=1 case for the harmonic numbers is a classical result, the general one was proved in 2009 by I. Mező and A. Dil.

The next relation connects the hyperharmonic numbers to the Hurwitz zeta function:

Integer hyperharmonic numbers

It is known, that the harmonic numbers are never integers except the case n=1. The same question can be posed with respect to the hyperharmonic numbers: are there integer hyperharmonic numbers? István Mező proved that if r=2 or r=3, these numbers are never integers except the trivial case when n=1. He conjectured that this is always the case, namely, the hyperharmonic numbers of order r are never integers except when n=1. This conjecture was justified for a class of parameters by R. Amrane and H. Belbachir. Especially, these authors proved that  is not integer for all r<26 and n=2,3,... Extension to high orders was made by Göral and Sertbaş. These authors have also shown that  is never integer when n is even or a prime power, or r is odd.

Another result is the following. Let  be the number of non-integer hyperharmonic numbers such that . Then, assuming the Cramér's conjecture,

The problem was finally settled by D. C. Sertbaş who found that there are infinitely many hyperharmonic integers, albeit they are quite huge. The smallest hyperharmonic number which is an integer found so far is

References

Number theory